The Patrick Cudahy Memorial is a public art work by American artist Felix de Weldon, located in Sheridan Park in Cudahy, Wisconsin.  The bronze sculpture depicts industrialist Patrick Cudahy standing and wearing a business suit.
The inscription reads:
PATRICK CUDAHY
FOUNDER OF THE CITY OF CUDAHY
MARCH 17 1849 - JULY 25, 1919 (shamrock) 
(Inscribed on side of base :) 
Lover of shrubs, flowers, trees 
(Inscribed on side of base:) 
Founder of the City of Cudahy

References

1965 establishments in Wisconsin
1965 sculptures
Bronze sculptures in Wisconsin
Monuments and memorials in Wisconsin
Outdoor sculptures in Milwaukee
Sculptures of men in Wisconsin
Statues in Wisconsin